The fourth edition of what later would be the European Short Course Championships was held in Stavanger, Norway, from 3 December to 4 December 1994. The event was named the European Sprint Swimming Championships. Only the 50 m events and the 100 m individual medley were at stake.

Medal table

Medal summary

Men's events

Women's events

References
Results on GBRSports.com

1994 in swimming
S
1994
S
Sport in Stavanger
Swimming competitions in Norway
December 1994 sports events in Europe